Ectoedemia rubifoliella is a moth of the  family Nepticulidae. It is found in eastern North America.

The wingspan is about 4 mm.

The larvae feed on blackberry. They mine the leaves of their host plant. The mine starts as a very narrow linear mine, which closely follows a vein or the margin of the leaf before enlarging into an irregular blotch. Mines containing larvae may be collected in July and September. The larvae are pale green and the cocoon is dark brown.

References

External links
Nepticulidae of North America

Nepticulidae
Moths of North America
Moths described in 1860